Magnis or Magna was a Roman fort on Hadrian's Wall in northern Britain. It is thought to have been sited with reference to the Stanegate Roman road, before the building of Hadrian's Wall, to which it is not physically attached. In fact the Vallum ditch unusually goes north of the fort, separating it from the Wall.

The fort is now the site of the Roman Army Museum.

Name 

The fort at Carvoran is generally identified with the 'Magnis' which appears both in the Ravenna Cosmography and the Notitia Dignitatum. Further evidence for the name comes from a fragmentary inscription (RIB 1825) apparently seen by the antiquary William Hutchinson in 1766 but which is now lost, which referred to "numerus Magne<c>e(n)s(ium)" ("of the unit of Magn[...] ...."). The name could be a Latin nominative form Magni, or Magna, and the fort is today sometimes referred to under the name "Magna". The name is rather inappropriate for a relatively small fort, and one suggestion is that it could ultimately derive from the Celtic word maen meaning "stone" or "rock".

Roman fort 
Magna was originally built to guard the junction of the Maiden Way Roman road (running north to south) with the Stanegate Roman road (running west to east), the key supply route linking Coria (Corbridge) in the east to Luguvalium (Carlisle) in the west. As such the fort predates Hadrian's Wall. Its ruins are located at Carvoran in the civil parish of Greenhead in the English county of Northumberland. Magna is one of 16 Roman forts along Hadrian's Wall; there were also 80 smaller milecastle forts and 158 turrets along its length. The Maiden Way ran south from Magna to Bravoniacum (Kirkby Thore near Penrith). An intermediate fort half-way between the two on the Maiden Way was Whitley Castle or Epiacum, just north of Alston in Cumbria, though the fort itself is just over the county boundary in Northumberland.

Five hundred Hamian archers, known as "Cohors Prima Hamiorum Sagittaria", were stationed at Magna starting from AD 120.

Archaeology 

The site is under the care of the Vindolanda Trust and has the same preservation layers of organic remains. Supported by a grant from the Heritage Lottery Fund, a five year excavation is beginning in June 2023. The first, 12-week, digging season will focus on the vallum and Milecastle 46 (both associated with Hadrians Wall), just north of the fort.

Roman Army Museum 
Magna is the location of the Roman Army Museum run by the Vindolanda Trust. Like the museum at Vindolanda, the Roman Army Museum was modernised and reopened in 2011. The museum illustrates frontier life on the northern edge of the Roman Empire. The museum displays genuine Roman artifacts including weapons and tools; life-size replicas; a 3D film showing Hadrian's Wall past and present, and a large timeline of Hadrian's Wall. There is a gallery devoted to the emperor Hadrian himself. A large gallery describes daily life in the Roman army as seen through the eyes of a team of eight auxiliary soldiers, complete with a film showing their activities. Notable exhibits include a rare surviving helmet crest.

Further reading

References

External links 

 "Magnis Carvetiorum" at Roman Britain Online
 "Hadrian's Wall: Carovoran Fort (Magna)" at North of the Tyne

Forts of Hadrian's Wall
History of Northumberland
Roman sites in Northumberland
Military and war museums in England
Roman auxiliary forts in England